Lee Feldman (born June 15, 1959, Seattle, Washington) is an American singer-songwriter and musician. Feldman grew up in New York City. He studied classical piano from an early age, attending the Manhattan School of Music (Precollege Division). In the mid-1970s he studied jazz at Berklee and studied privately with Roland Hanna. Feldman earned a degree in composition from Indiana University's Jacobs School of Music in 1981 and returned to New York.

Feldman's musical style has been compared to Randy Newman and Loudon Wainwright III. In 1995, he released his debut album, the critically acclaimed Living It All Wrong (Allmusic ). His next two efforts, The Man in the Jupiter Hat (2000) (Allmusic) and I've Forgotten Everything (2006) also won high praise. He has also created the animated musical Starboy. In addition to creating and performing music, Feldman teaches music at the Third Street Music School Settlement in Manhattan. Feldman is the president of the Third Street Faculty Association, the first teachers' union at Third Street. He is also the director of LF/S BROOKLYN, an art gallery in Williamsburg, Brooklyn.

Feldman lives in Riverdale, the Bronx.

Discography
Living It All Wrong (1995)
The Man in the Jupiter Hat (2000)
I've Forgotten Everything (2006)
Album No. 4: Trying to Put the Things Together that Never Been Together Before (2012)

References

External links
Official website
"Lee Feldman, Lee Feldman" (documentary)
Starboy
[ Lee Feldman on allmusic]
Art Dudley on Lee Feldman

1959 births
Jewish American musicians
Living people
Jewish rock musicians
Singer-songwriters from Washington (state)
20th-century American pianists
American male pianists
21st-century American pianists
20th-century American male musicians
21st-century American male musicians
21st-century American Jews
American male singer-songwriters